Phyllachoraceae is a family of sac fungi.

Genera
As accepted by 2020 Outline (with amount of species per genus);

Ascovaginospora  (1)
Brobdingnagia   (4)
Camarotella  (8)
Coccodiella  (27)
Cyclodomus  (5)
Deshpandiella  (1)
Diachora  (4)
Diatractium  (4)
Erikssonia  (5)
Fremitomyces  (2)
Geminispora  (2)
Gibellina  (2)
Imazekia  (1)
Isothea  (4)
Lichenochora  (44)
Lindauella  (1)
Linochora  (37)
Lohwagia  (3)
Maculatifrondes  (1)
Malthomyces  (2)

Muelleromyces  (1)
Neoflageoletia  (1)
Neophyllachora  (4)
Ophiodothella  (31)
Ophiodothis  (6)
Orphnodactylis  (2)
Oxodeora  (1)
Parberya  (2)
Petrakiella  (1)

Phycomelaina  (1)
Phyllachora  (1513)
Phylleutypa  (3)
Phyllocrea  (3)

Pseudothiella  (1)
Pseudothiopsella  (1)
Pterosporidium  (2)
Rehmiodothis  (10)
Retroa  (2)
Rhodosticta  (2)
Rikatlia  (1)
Schizochora  (3)
Sphaerodothella  (1)
Sphaerodothis  (43)
Stigmatula  (10)
Stigmochora  (12)
Stromaster  (1)
Tamsiniella  (1)

Telimenella  (3)
Telimenochora  (1)
Trabutia  (1)
Tribulatia  (1)
Trabutiella  (3)
Uropolystigma  (1)
Vitreostroma  (3)
Zimmermanniella  (1)

See also
Camarotella costaricensis

References

Phyllachorales
Taxa named by Ferdinand Theissen
Taxa named by Hans Sydow
Taxa described in 1915